Machine-readable postal marking may refer to:

POSTNET, Postal Numeric Encoding Technique, which encodes ZIP codes, ZIP+4 codes and (optionally) delivery points
Postal Alpha Numeric Encoding Technique, PLANET, barcode used by the U.S. Postal Service
Facing Identification Mark, a bar code designed by the U.S. Postal Service 
Intelligent Mail barcode, replaces POSTNET and PLANET
Identification Code Tracking

See also 
Machine-readability (disambiguation)